Ribera Baja/Erribera Beitia (also Basque alternative Erriberabeitia) is a town and municipality located in the province of Álava, in the Basque Country, northern Spain. The coordinates given point to a location 37 km NW of Granada, not to the Basque country.

References

External links
 RIBERA BAJA/ERRIBERA BEITIA in the Bernardo Estornés Lasa - Auñamendi Encyclopedia (Euskomedia Fundazioa) 

Municipalities in Álava